The 2018 Melrose Sevens also known as the Aberdeen Standard Investments Melrose Sevens  was be the 128th staging of the world’s oldest annual Rugby sevens competition at the home of Melrose RFC at the Greenyards in Melrose, Scotland on Saturday 14 April 2018. It was played as a male only competition which featured 24 teams in a single elimination tournament with all the ties from the first round though to the final being played throughout the same day and formed part of the Kings of the Sevens series.

The later stages of the tournament was televised live for the last time on BBC Two Scotland and locally, from the first tie right through to the final, on Radio Borders.

The tournament was won by Scottish side Watsonian after they beat the home side Melrose 19-14 in a tightly fought final to win the Ladies Cup for the first time since 1996 and was Melrose’s second consecutive loss in the final.

Teams 
The main tournament will consist of 21 teams from across Scotland as well as two specially invited overseas teams from the United States and Poland and the charity team Crusaders to make a combined total of 24 teams.

Seedings
Sixteen unseeded Scottish sides will enter the competition in the first round whilst the seeded teams which includes the hosts Melrose, the four remaining Scottish teams Ayr, Jed-Forest, Edinburgh Accies and Watsonian the two invited overseas teams and the charity side Crusaders will enter the competition in the second round.

Unseeded teams which enter in the First round

 Aberdeen
 Boroughmuir
 Cartha
 Currie
 Dundee
 Edinburgh Uni
 GHA
 Glasgow Hawks
 Gala
 Hawick
 Heriot’s
 Kelso
 Marr
 Selkirk
 Stirling County
 Peebles

Seeded teams which enter in the Second round

 Ayr
 Crusaders
 Edinburgh Accies
 Jed-Forest 
 Melrose
 Poland
 USA Tigers
 Watsonian

Tournament
The draw for the first and second rounds was made at the Greenyards in Melrose on Saturday 7 April 2018.

First round

Second round

Quarter-finals

Semi-finals

Final

This was the first Melrose Sevens final where the playing time was reduced from twenty to fourteen minutes in line with all other sevens matches.

See also
Melrose Sevens
Rugby sevens

References 

Rugby sevens competitions in Scotland
Rugby union in the Scottish Borders
Melrose, Scottish Borders
Melrose Sevens
Melrose Sevens